Cornett is a surname. Notable people with the surname include:

Abbie Cornett (born 1966), American politician
Betty Jane Cornett (1932–2006), American baseball player
Bill Cornett, American musician
Brack Cornett (outlaw) (died 1888), American outlaw
Brad Cornett (born 1969), American baseball player
Flip Cornett (1957–2004), American guitarist
Jonathan Webster Cornett (1883–1973), Canadian mayor
Leanza Cornett (1971–2020), American television personality
Marshall E. Cornett (1898–1947), American businessman and politician
Mick Cornett (born c. 1958), American politician
Natasha Cornett (born 1979), American murderer
R. Orin Cornett (1913–2002), American physicist
Samantha Cornett (born 1991), Canadian squash player